Gaurotes fairmairei is a species of beetle in the family Cerambycidae. It was described by Per Olof Christopher Aurivillius in 1912.

References

Lepturinae
Beetles described in 1912